Alisa Jakobi (born 18 January 1981) is an Estonian artist, actress and graphic designer.

Life and education

Alisa Jakobi  is an Estonian artist. She studied in the Estonian Academy of Arts, completing a BA in Graphic Design in 2005. Later she left Estonia for three years to get new inspiration and experience in New York. In 2010 she finished her MA in Art studies in the Tallinn University.
Alisa studied in the School of Visual Arts in New York City for a year, worked for Rockaway Graphics as a graphic designer, worked as an assistant to photographer Ilay Honovich, in NYC.
In 2011 she created Art Jakobi Ltd and started working independently.

2005 Estonian Academy of Arts, Faculty of Graphic Design
2005–06 SVA (School of Visual Arts, NYC), arts management
2007–10 University of Tallinn "Fine Art"

Painting

Alisa is working in a minimalist expressionism style, with elements of fauvism. Her recurring topics are the reconciliation of humans with nature and about the relationship between the conscious and unconscious mind. She also developed a concept called "Time to Dance", where she is talking about the depth of the human mind and the changing roles in life of men and women.

Works in private collections
Her works are in private collections in Estonia, Latvia, France, Israel, the US, the UK, Macedonia, Russia, Australia.

Solo exhibitions (selection)

2016 OR – LIGHT – Valgus - СВЕТ , Tallinn Lennart Meri Airport Gallery
2016 Emotional Landscapes vol 5, Võru city gallery, Võru, Estonia 
2015 IT IS TIME TO DANCE vol 2, Fahle gallery, Tallinn, Estonia
2015 Emotional Landscapes vol4, Rakvere city gallery, Rakvere, Estonia
2015 Emotional Landscapes vol3, Kuressaare muuseum, Kuressaare, Saaremaa, Estonia
2015 Emotional Landscapes vol2.5, Ministry of Agriculture, Tallinn, Estonia
2015 Emotional Landscapes vol.2, Toompea Castle Art Gallery, Tallinn, Estonia, Estonia
2014 Emotional Landscapes vol.2, Tallinn Lennart Meri Airport Gallery, Estonia
2014 Emotional Landscapes, Aedvilja Tänava Gallery, Tallinn, Estonia
2014 IT IS TIME TO DANCE, Aedvilja Tänava Gallery, Tallinn, Estonia 
2002 Light and Colour, Showing room of JCC, at Karu 16 A, Tallinn, Estonia

Group exhibitions (selection)
2016 – Futu Muhu 2016, curatored by Karl-Kristjan Nagel and Tiiu Rebane. Kuressaare, Estonia
2016 – “Peace“ exhibition against terrorism, group exhibition of estonian artists in GALERIE DE LA VERRIERE, Paris, France 
2016 –“Peace“ group exhibition of estonian artists  in 12 AVENUE DES ARTS gallery, Paris, France 
2015 – “ 5th PLainair in Juodkrante", LIUDVIKO RĖZOS cultural cente, Neringa municipality, Curonian Spit, Lithuania
2015 – “NIDOS EKSPRESIJA-2015“ Agila culture centre, Nida, Curonian Spit, Lithuania. Curator: S. Kruopis 
2015 – “Symphony of colours“ Tallinna Idakeskus gallery. Curator T.Kuusik
2015 – AmCham charity auction, Tallinn, Estonia.  (amcham.ee) 
2015 – BECC charity Burns supper auction, Tallinn, Estonia (charity.becc.ee)
2014 – International group exhibition at Monastir Joakim Osogovski, Kriva Palanka, Macedonia
2014 – Performing art "Music+painting" experimental music session, Tallinn, Estonia, Gustav Adolf Grammar
School courtyard https://www.facebook.com/events/259752777557060/
2013 – TALLINNA KUNSTI TUULED, Art Fair in Tammsaare park, Tallinn, Estonia.
2012 – Strike – exhibition of Art Teachers in Estonian parliament, Riigikogu,Tallinn, Estonia.
2010 – Ahne 2010, Suvilahti, Finland 
2008 – Ahne 2008 Video "Time to Dance", Suvilahti, Finland 
2008 – Kunst@tlu, Draakoni gallery, Tallinn, Estonia.
2008 – Art Kitchen Happening@Fantast Festival, Muhu, Saaremaa island, Muhu, Estonia.
2005 – Exhibition of posters, Gallery of Estonian Academy of Arts, Tallinn, Estonia.
2003 – Group exhibition of emerging artists in NYC, Broadway gallery, New York City 
2002 – Madonna of 21 Century, Jaama Gallery, Tallinn, Estonia.

References

External links

Alisa Jakobi's Homepage
Time to Dance exhibition opening
Emotional landscapes vol 2

Donator and participant for charity auction Burns supper in 2014
Illustration made for Beseder.ru daily publisher. 2016
Illustration made Beseder.ru daily publisher. 2016
Illustration made Beseder.ru daily publisher. 2015

1981 births
Living people
Estonian painters
Actresses from Tallinn
Estonian film actresses
21st-century Estonian actresses
21st-century Estonian painters
21st-century Estonian women artists
Estonian women painters
Estonian Academy of Arts alumni